Thanh Luông is a commune (xã) and village of the Điện Biên District of Điện Biên Province, northwestern Vietnam.

Communes of Điện Biên province
Geography of Điện Biên province